The 2012–13 Alabama Crimson Tide men's basketball team (variously "Alabama", "UA", "Bama" or "The Tide") represented the University of Alabama in the 2012–13 college basketball season. The team's head coach was Anthony Grant, who was in his fourth season at Alabama after posting a 21-12 record in the 2011–12 season, where the Crimson Tide finished fifth in the SEC and received a bid to the 2012 NCAA Division I men's basketball tournament. The team played their home games at Coleman Coliseum in Tuscaloosa, Alabama, as a member of the Southeastern Conference.

Pre-season

The 2011–12 season was the third under head coach Anthony Grant and was the 99th season of basketball in the school's history. The squad finished the season 21–12 overall (9–7 SEC), and finished in 5th place. They were defeated by Florida in the quarterfinals of the 2012 SEC men's basketball tournament, and they lost to Creighton in the second round of the NCAA Tournament.

Departures

Class of 2012 signees

Roster

Depth chart

Schedule and results

|-
!colspan=12 style="background:#990000; color:#FFFFFF;"| Exhibition

|-
!colspan=12 style="background:#990000; color:#FFFFFF;"| Non-Conference Regular Season

|-
!colspan=12 style="background:#990000; color:#FFFFFF;"| SEC Regular Season

|-
!colspan=12 style="background:#990000; color:#FFFFFF;"| 2013 SEC tournament

|-
!colspan=12 style="background:#990000; color:#FFFFFF;"| 2013 NIT

|-

Source: 2012–13 Schedule. Rolltide.com

Rankings

See also
Iron Bowl of Basketball
2012–13 NCAA Division I men's basketball season
2012–13 NCAA Division I men's basketball rankings

References

Alabama
Alabama Crimson Tide men's basketball seasons
Alabama
Alabama Crimson Tide
Alabama Crimson Tide